The Jewish National Council (JNC; , Va'ad Le'umi), also known as the Jewish People's Council was the main national executive organ of the Assembly of Representatives of the Jewish community (Yishuv) within Mandatory Palestine. Its responsibilities included education, culture, local government, welfare, healthcare, religious service,  security and defense. Since 1928 it was also the official representative of the Yishuv to the British Mandate government. Established in 1920, it operated until 1948, when its functions were passed to the newly-established state of Israel.

History
The JNC was established in 1920, the same year as the Histadrut and the Haganah were founded, in order to conduct Jewish communal affairs. Its first chairman was Rabbi Abraham Isaac Kook. Jewish communal affairs were generally conducted through a hierarchy of representative organizations, including the JNC. Another of these organizations was the Assembly of Representatives (Mandatory Palestine), which had three hundred members who selected from among themselves the members of the National Council.

The members of the JNC also participated in meetings of the Zionist General Council. The organization represented almost all major Jewish factions, however a few smaller groups at first objected to the creation of centralized leadership. Notably, Agudat Israel joined only in 1935. It was announce only in 1946 that the Sephardic Jews and the Zionist Revisionists, would stop refusing to participate in the JNC.

Role in the establishment of Israel
The Political Department of the JNC was responsible for relations with the Arabs, ties with the Jewish Agency and negotiations with the British government. As the yishuv grew, the JNC adopted more functions, such as education, health care and welfare services, internal defense and security matters, and organized recruitment to the British forces during World War II. In the 1940s, departments for physical training, culture and press and information were added. 

The report of the Anglo-American Committee of Inquiry issued in 1946, stated: 
"The Jews have developed, under the aegis of the Jewish Agency and the JNC, a strong and tightly-woven community. There thus exists a virtual Jewish nonterritorial State with its own executive and legislative organs..."

When the State of Israel was established in 1948, this departmental structure served as a basis for the government ministries. On March 2, 1948, the New Jewish Council: 
" begins work on organization of Jewish provisional government"  

On May 14, 1948, (the expiration day of the British Mandate), its members gathered at the Tel Aviv Museum of Art and ratified the proclamation declaring the establishment of the State of Israel. The members of the JNC formed the provisional government of the nascent State of Israel.

Departments 
 The Political Department 
 The Education Department
 The Health Department
 The Communities Department
 The Rabbinate
 The Social Welfare Department

Presidents 
 1920–1929 David Yellin
 1929–1931 Pinhas Rutenberg
 1931–1944 Yitzhak Ben-Zvi
 1944–1948 David Remez

See also

 History of Israel
 Jewish Agency for Israel
 Zionism
:Category:Jewish National Council members

References

External links

 Vaad Leumi at the Jewish Virtual Library
 Country Studies Program,  at the Library of Congress
 Facts About Israel-History at MFA
 The Cry of the Children in Palestine 
 Between the World Wars

Politics of Mandatory Palestine
Jewish organizations in Mandatory Palestine
Provisional governments
1920 establishments in Mandatory Palestine
1948 disestablishments in Mandatory Palestine